Roshchino is the name of several inhabited localities in Russia.

Modern localities
Urban localities
Roshchino, Leningrad Oblast, an urban-type settlement under the administrative jurisdiction of Roshchinskoye Settlement Municipal Formation in Vyborgsky District of Leningrad Oblast

Rural localities
Roshchino, Amur Oblast, a selo in Razdolnensky Rural Settlement of Tambovsky District in Amur Oblast
Roshchino, Belgorod Oblast, a settlement in Valuysky District of Belgorod Oblast
Roshchino, Chelyabinsk Oblast, a settlement in Roshchinsky Selsoviet of Sosnovsky District in Chelyabinsk Oblast
Roshchino, Guryevsky District, Kaliningrad Oblast, a settlement in Lugovskoy Rural Okrug of Guryevsky District in Kaliningrad Oblast
Roshchino, Gvardeysky District, Kaliningrad Oblast, a settlement in Slavinsky Rural Okrug of Gvardeysky District in Kaliningrad Oblast
Roshchino, Pravdinsky District, Kaliningrad Oblast, a settlement in Domnovsky Rural Okrug of Pravdinsky District in Kaliningrad Oblast
Roshchino, Zelenogradsky District, Kaliningrad Oblast, a settlement in Kovrovsky Rural Okrug of Zelenogradsky District in Kaliningrad Oblast
Roshchino, Khabarovsk Krai, a selo in Khabarovsky District of Khabarovsk Krai
Roshchino, Dalmatovsky District, Kurgan Oblast, a village under the administrative jurisdiction of Dalmatovo Town Under District Jurisdiction in Dalmatovsky District of Kurgan Oblast
Roshchino, Kargapolsky District, Kurgan Oblast, a village in Chashinsky Selsoviet of Kargapolsky District in Kurgan Oblast
Roshchino, Republic of Mordovia, a selo in Starokovylyaysky Selsoviet of Temnikovsky District in the Republic of Mordovia
Roshchino, Staraya Russa, Novgorod Oblast, a village under the administrative jurisdiction of the town of oblast significance of Staraya Russa in Novgorod Oblast
Roshchino, Valdaysky District, Novgorod Oblast, a settlement in Roshchinskoye Settlement of Valdaysky District in Novgorod Oblast
Roshchino, Omsk Oblast, a selo in Roshchinsky Rural Okrug of Gorkovsky District in Omsk Oblast
Roshchino, Orenburg Oblast, a settlement in Rodinsky Selsoviet of Sorochinsky District in Orenburg Oblast
Roshchino, Penza Oblast, a selo in Roshchinsky Selsoviet of Serdobsky District in Penza Oblast
Roshchino, Primorsky Krai, a selo in Krasnoarmeysky District of Primorsky Krai
Roshchino, Sakhalin Oblast, a selo in Smirnykhovsky District of Sakhalin Oblast
Roshchino, Saratov Oblast, a selo in Volsky District of Saratov Oblast
Roshchino, Stavropol Krai, a settlement in Roshchinsky Selsoviet of Kursky District in Stavropol Krai
Roshchino, Tver Oblast, a village in Bokhtovskoye Rural Settlement of Lesnoy District in Tver Oblast
Roshchino, Ulyanovsk Oblast, a settlement in Bezvodovsky Rural Okrug of Kuzovatovsky District in Ulyanovsk Oblast
Roshchino, Vladimir Oblast, a village in Petushinsky District of Vladimir Oblast
Roshchino, Belozersky District, Vologda Oblast, a village in Gulinsky Selsoviet of Belozersky District in Vologda Oblast
Roshchino, Cherepovetsky District, Vologda Oblast, a khutor in Sudsky Selsoviet of Cherepovetsky District in Vologda Oblast
Roshchino, Yaroslavl Oblast, a settlement in Slobodskoy Rural Okrug of Danilovsky District in Yaroslavl Oblast

Abolished localities
Roshchino, Tyumen Oblast, a settlement under the administrative jurisdiction of Kalininsky Administrative Okrug of the City of Tyumen in Tyumen Oblast; abolished in December 2013

See also
Roshchin